This article lists the main ice climbing events and their results for 2019, including the UIAA Ice Climbing World Youth Championships, the UIAA Ice Climbing World Championships, the UIAA Ice Climbing World Cup, and the Ice Climbing European Cup.

World Championships

World Cup

European Cup

References

External links
 International Climbing and Mountaineering Federation Website (UIAA)

Ice climbing
2019 in sports
2019 sport-related lists